Tom Tombrello (1936–2014) was a Caltech H. Goddard Professor of Physics. He earned B.A., M.A., and Ph.D. degrees in physics, all at Rice University.  He studied nuclear reactions in the 1960s, which helped show how chemical elements are created.

He chaired the Division of Physics, Mathematics and Astronomy at Caltech from 1998 to 2008. He helped create Physics 11, a freshman physics course that encouraged students to think in nonconventional ways. On May 30, 1997 Tombrello received an honorary doctorate from the Faculty of Science and Technology at Uppsala University, Sweden
In 2010, Tombrello became a founding Trustee of the London Institute for Mathematical Sciences.

References

American physicists
California Institute of Technology faculty
Rice University alumni
1936 births
2014 deaths